Yenagudde is a census town in Udupi district in the Indian state of Karnataka.

Demographics
 India census, Yenagudde had a population of 4537. Males constitute 47% of the population and females 53%. Yenagudde has an average literacy rate of 81%, higher than the national average of 59.5%: male literacy is 85%, and female literacy is 76%. In Yenagudde, 9% of the population is under 6 years of age.

References

Cities and towns in Udupi district